Crassispira finitima is an extinct species of sea snail, a marine gastropod mollusk in the family Pseudomelatomidae, the turrids and allies.

Distribution
Fossils have been found in Eocene strata in the Ile-de-France, France.

References

 de Boury, E., 1899. Révision des pleurotomes éocènes du Bassin de Paris. La Feuille des Jeunes Naturalistes 29: 117–163, sér. 3° série

External links
 Pacaud J.M. & Le Renard J. (1995). Révision des Mollusques paléogènes du Bassin de Paris. IV- Liste systématique actualisée. Cossmanniana. 3(4): 151-187

finitima
Gastropods described in 1899